15 Great Hits is the fifth album by the rock band The Kingsmen, released in 1966.

Release and reception

The Kingsmen's fifth album was an amalgam containing seven new songs, one previously released single, four alternate versions of previously released songs, and three tracks from earlier LPs.  The album entered the Billboard LP chart on August 20, 1966, and remained for eight weeks, peaking at #87. The album's sales were supported by the continued popularity of "Louie Louie" (re-released in 1966 as "Louie Louie 64-65-66") and the Kingsmen's busy touring schedule.

Both mono (WDM 674) and stereo (WDS 674) versions were released.  International releases included Canada (Wand 674), France (Disques Vogue CLVLXS 101 30), Taiwan (CSJ 519, orange vinyl), and United Kingdom (Pye International NPL 28085). The album has not been reissued on CD.

This was the group's fifth and final album chart appearance, and the last effort by the 1963-1966 line-up of Lynn Easton, Mike Mitchell, Barry Curtis, Dick Peterson, and Norm Sundholm.  Later in 1966, Barry Curtis was drafted and Norm Sundholm left to develop Sunn amplifiers.

Track listing
 Twist & Shout – 2:58 (P. Medley-B. Russell)
 Money – 2:13 (B. Gordy-J. Bradford)
 Jenny Take a Ride (C.C. Rider) – 3:14 (B. Crewe-E. Johnson-R. Penniman)
 Do You Love Me – 2:36 (Berry Gordy)
 Oo Poo Pah Doo – 3:01 (Jessie Hill)
 Shout – 2:22 (Isley Brothers)
 New Orleans – 2:53 (F. Guida-J. Royster)
 Fever – 3:14 (Eddie Cooley & Otis Blackwell)
 Killer Joe – 2:15 (Russell-Elgin-Medley)
 Good Lovin' – 2:17 (A. Resnick-R. Clark)
 Quarter to Three – 2:05  (F. Guida-G. Barge-J. Royster)
 Poison Ivy – 2:09 (J. Leiber-M. Stoller)
 Searchin' – 3:22 (J. Leiber-M. Stoller)
 Hang On Sloopy – 2:42 (Russell-W. Farrell)
 Satisfaction – 3:32 (Jagger/Richards)

Charts

Musicians and production
Lynn Easton: vocals, saxophone
Mike Mitchell: vocals, lead guitar
Barry Curtis: organist
Norm Sundholm: bass guitar
Dick Peterson:  drums
Producer:  A Jerden Production by Jerry Dennon
Liner notes:  Don Steele (KHJ)
Cover design:  Burt Goldblatt

Notes

1966 albums
The Kingsmen albums